Supervivientes: Expedición Robinson 2000, was the first season of the show Supervivientes to air in Spain and it was broadcast on Telecinco from September 10, 2000 to December 3, 2000. This season took place in Panama. For this season the contestants were initially divided into the North and South teams. During the pre-merge portion of this season an item known as the talisman came into play whenever a player was eliminated. When a player was voted out of the game they could leave the talisman to any tribe member of their choice. Despite her initial elimination from the game in episode three, Ana Maria Fernandez was allowed to return to the game, only this time as a replacement on the North team for Juan Antonio Ruiz who was forced to leave the game due to health reasons. When the tribes merged, for the first few days following the merge there weren't any immunity challenges. When it came time for the final four, the contestants took part in two challenges in order to determine who would be the finalists. Ultimately, it was Xavier Monjonell who won this season over María Elena García by an unknown jury vote and took home the grand prize of 10,000,000 pesetas.

Finishing order

Voting history

 Juan Antonio had to quit the game due to medical reasons. To replace him the eliminated contestant from this episode would come back to the game. Ana Mª was eliminated with 4 votes but she replaced Juan Antonio and swapped tribes.

External links
https://web.archive.org/web/20010411003515/http://www.supervivientes.jumpy.es/index.htm

Survivor Spain seasons